Václav Pěchouček (born 5 March 1979) is a retired Czech football midfielder.

Pěchouček played his youth football by Viktoria Plzeň. He moved to Switzerland and joined FC Basel's first team during the winter break of their 1997–98 season under head coach Guy Mathez. Pěchouček played his domestic league debut for the club in the away game in the Stade de la Maladière on 2 May 1998 as Basel were 1–2 by Xamax. He scored his first goal for his club one week later on 9 May in the home game in the St. Jakob Stadium as Basel won 4–1 against Young Boys. He stayed with the club until the end of the following season. During this time Pěchouček played a total of 23 games for Basel scoring just that one goal. 10 of these games were in the Nationalliga A, one in the Swiss Cup and 12 were friendly games.

After his time with Basel, Pěchouček played one season with FC Baden before he returned to his club of origin Viktoria Plzeň. He played with them for three seasons and then returned to Switzerland. In 2003 Pěchouček signed for FC Naters and played with them for four and a half seasons. He played for four other semi-pro and amateur clubs before ending his active career in 2012.

References

Sources
 Rotblau: Jahrbuch Saison 2017/2018. Publisher: FC Basel Marketing AG. 
 Die ersten 125 Jahre. Publisher: Josef Zindel im Friedrich Reinhardt Verlag, Basel. 
 Verein "Basler Fussballarchiv" Homepage

1979 births
Living people
Czech footballers
FC Basel players
FC Baden players
FC Viktoria Plzeň players
FC Biel-Bienne players
Association football midfielders
Swiss Super League players
Czech First League players
Czech expatriate footballers
Expatriate footballers in Switzerland
Czech expatriate sportspeople in Switzerland